Charlie Bicknell may refer to:

 Charlie Bicknell (footballer) (1905–1994), English footballer
 Charlie Bicknell (baseball) (1928–2013), American Major League Baseball pitcher